The Fairchild 91, (a.k.a. A-942), was a single-engine eight-passenger flying boat airliner developed in the United States in the mid-1930s.

Design
Fairchild designed the aircraft in response to a Pan American Airways request for a small flying boat to operate on their river routes along the Amazon and Yangtze. The result was a conventional high-wing cantilever monoplane with its radial engine mounted above the wing in a streamlined nacelle. Before construction of the prototype was complete, however, Pan American no longer required the aircraft to operate in China, and Fairchild optimised the design for the Brazilian tropics.

Operational history
After the first two aircraft were delivered, Pan American cancelled the remaining four aircraft of its order as they no longer needed any for China and the two aircraft were capable of handling the Amazon River. 

The sole A-942-B was specially built for the American Museum of Natural History and was used by naturalist Richard Archbold on his second expedition to Papua New Guinea in 1936–1937. 

The prototype was sold to the Spanish Republican Air Force, but the ship carrying it was captured by the Spanish Nationalists and was used by them until 1941. 

The A-942 bought by industrialist Garfield Wood was sold to the British American Ambulance Corps before being transferred to the RAF, who operated it in Egypt for air-sea rescue.

One exampled was sold to the Imperial Japanese Naval Air Service for evaluation, but was wrecked shortly after delivery, so a second example was purchased to replace it.

Variants
Fairchild 91 Baby Clipper
Initial version built to Pan Am specifications for use on rivers, powered by a  Pratt & Whitney S2EG Hornet. Six built.
Fairchild A-942-A
Alternative designation for the Fairchild 91
Fairchild 91B Jungle Clipper
Specially equipped for NYC Museum of Natural History, powered by a  Wright SGR-1820F-52 Cyclone. One built, NR777.
Fairchild A-942-B
Alternative designation for the Fairchild 91B.
Fairchild XSOK-1
Proposed U.S. Navy scout; none built.
Fairchild LXF
Two A-942Bs supplied to the Imperial Japanese Navy Air Service for evaluation.

Airframes

Specifications (A-942-A)

See also

References

Notes

Bibliography

Taylor, Michael J.H. . Jane's Encyclopedia of Aviation. Studio Editions. London. 1989.  
 
 

1930s United States airliners
Flying boats
91
Single-engined tractor aircraft
High-wing aircraft
Aircraft first flown in 1935